"Saltwater" is a song by English singer-songwriter Julian Lennon. It was written by Lennon, Mark Spiro, and Leslie Spiro. Originally released on the album Help Yourself, the single peaked at number six in the United Kingdom in October 1991 and topped the Australian ARIA Singles Chart for four weeks in March 1992. "Saltwater" was the 14th-highest-selling single of 1992 in Australia, where it is certified platinum.

In 2016, Lennon rerecorded the song as "Saltwater 25" on 14 December 2016 saying that a proportion of the proceeds would go to The White Feather Foundation.

Background

Unlike most of Lennon's previous songs, "Saltwater" combines subtle melodies with gentle vocals to bring forward the issues of environmental conservation and world poverty. The lyrics juxtapose the many marvels and feats of human civilisation with the death of the natural world, constantly emphasising the passing of time — "Time is not a friend, 'cos friends we're out of time".

The recording features a lead guitar solo in the style of George Harrison. Lennon originally wrote a guitar solo for the song. At the suggestion of his producer Bob Ezrin, he then contacted Harrison to play the solo instead. Harrison was busy at the time consoling Eric Clapton whose son had recently died. He recorded a couple of riffs and sent them back to Lennon. Guitar player Steve Hunter then played the actual solo on the song, combining elements of both Lennon's and Harrison's solos. In the liner notes for the Help Yourself album, Harrison is given special thanks.

Track listings

CD single
 "Saltwater" – 3:46
 "Rebel King" – 4:30
 "Cre que voy a llorar" – 4:07
 "Mother Mary" – 4:53

12-inch single
A1. "Saltwater" – 4:07
B1. "Rebel King" (edit) – 4:30
B2. "Creo que voy a llorar" – 4:07

7-inch and cassette single
A. "Saltwater" – 3:46
B. "Rebel King" (edit) – 4:30

Australian CD and cassette EP
 "Saltwater"
 "Now You're in Heaven"
 "Too Late for Goodbyes"
 "Say You're Wrong"
 "Rebel King" (edit)

Charts

Weekly charts

Year-end charts

Certifications

Covers
An instrumental version (Guitar Duet) of this song was recorded by Chet Atkins and Tommy Emmanuel on their album The Day Finger Pickers Took Over the World. Anni-Frid Lyngstad from ABBA performed the song at the open-air gala concert "Artister för Miljö" and included her cover as a B-side on her single "Änglamark".

References

1991 singles
Atlantic Records singles
Environmental songs
Julian Lennon songs
Number-one singles in Australia
Song recordings produced by Bob Ezrin
Songs written by Julian Lennon
Songs written by Mark Spiro
Virgin Records singles